Isaiah Thomas (January 19, 1749 – April 4, 1831) was an early American printer, newspaper publisher and author. He performed the first public reading of the Declaration of Independence in Worcester, Massachusetts, and reported the first account of the Battles of Lexington and Concord.  He was the founder of the American Antiquarian Society.

Biography

Early life and career
Thomas was born in Boston, Massachusetts. He was apprenticed on July 7, 1756, to Zechariah Fowle, a Boston printer, with whom, after working as a printer in Halifax, Portsmouth (New Hampshire) and Charleston (South Carolina), he formed a partnership in 1770.

The Massachusetts Spy

The partnership was formed to publish the Massachusetts Spy, and lasted for three months, after which Thomas continued publication alone. For the paper's motto, he chose "Open to all parties, but influenced by none."  Initially it came out three times each week, then (under his sole ownership) as a semi-weekly, and beginning in 1771, as a weekly. The paper soon espoused the Whig cause and was the object of government efforts to suppress it. In 1771 Governor Thomas Hutchinson ordered the attorney general to prosecute Thomas, but the grand jury failed to find cause for indictment.

In Boston, in 1774, Thomas published the Royal American Magazine, which was continued for a short time by Joseph Greenleaf, and which contained many engravings by Paul Revere.

Escape to Worcester
Wary of the Tories' growing resentment of the independence of the Spy, on April 16, 1775 (three days before the Battle of Concord, in which he took part), Thomas took his presses from Boston and set them up in Worcester. His other property was destroyed.  In Worcester, he published and sold books, built a paper mill and book-bindery, and continued the paper until 1802 save for gaps in 1776–1778 and in 1786–1788. The Spy supported George Washington and the Federalist Party. He was also postmaster for a time.

Thomas married Mary Fowle, described as a "half-cousin", on May 26, 1779. Around 1802, Thomas gave his Worcester business over to his son, including the control of the Spy.

Later life
From 1775 until 1803, Thomas published the New England Almanac, continued until 1819 by his son, Isaiah Thomas Jr. It had something of the flavor of Benjamin Franklin's Poor Richard's Almanack. In 1786 he procured from Europe the first font of music type that was brought to the United States, and he was the first printer in the U.S. to use such type. He was engaged at Walpole, New Hampshire, in book publishing and printing the Farmer's Museum, and in 1788 opened a bookstore in Boston under the firm name of Thomas and Andrews, also establishing branches of his publishing business in several parts of the United States. The monthly Massachusetts Magazine was published by the firm, with Ebenezer T. Andrews, in eight volumes, from 1789 until 1796. At Worcester he printed a folio edition of the Bible in 1791, Watts' Psalms and Hymns, and most of the Bibles and school books that were used in the U.S. at that date.

His ambition throughout his life was to write an extensive book on the history of publishing.
He began what would become History of Printing in America in 1808. Fully titled History of Printing in America, with a Biography of Printers, and an Account of Newspapers, it was published in two volumes in 1810. A second edition, published in 1874, was prepared by his grandson Benjamin Franklin Thomas and included a catalog of American publications previous to 1776 and a memoir of Isaiah Thomas.

In November 1812, Thomas founded the American Society of Antiquaries, now known as the American Antiquarian Society, partly to take care of the extensive library he had accumulated in preparing his history of publishing. At its first meeting, Thomas was elected president, a role he held until his death. In addition to nearly 8,000 volumes from his collection, he gave to its library tracts, and one of the most valuable files of newspapers in the country, and he presented land and a hall, with a provision equal to $24,000 for its maintenance. In 1816, Thomas was elected a member of the American Philosophical Society in Philadelphia.

Thomas spent his final days in Worcester. Upon his death in 1831, he bequeathed his entire library, his collection of early American newspapers, as well as his personal papers and records to the American Antiquarian Society.

Thomas is interred at Rural Cemetery in Worcester.

Legacy
Thomas's grandson B. F. Thomas noted his grandfather's importance in founding the American Antiquarian Society. "He saw and understood, no man better, from what infinitely varied and minute sources the history of a nation's life was to be drawn; that the only safe rule was to gather up all the fragments so that nothing be lost." In 1943, Publishers Weekly created the Carey-Thomas Award for creative publishing, named in honor of Mathew Carey and Isaiah Thomas.

See also  
 Isaac Collins (printer)
 William Goddard (publisher)
 History of American newspapers
 John Holt (publisher)
 William Hunter (publisher)
 William Parks (publisher)
 Alexander Purdie (publisher)
 Joseph Royle (publisher)

Notes

References

Further reading

 Emblidge, David. "Isaiah Thomas invents the bookstore chain." Publishing Research Quarterly 28.1 (2012): 53–64.
 Humphrey, Carol Sue. "Greater Distance= Declining Interest: Massachusetts Printers and Protections for a Free Press, 1783-1791." American Journalism 9.3-4 (1992): 12–19.
 Humphrey, Carol Sue. "“That Bulwark of Our Liberties”: Massachusetts Printers and the Issue of a Free Press, 1783–1788." Journalism History 14.1 (1987): 34-38.
 Kroeger, Karl. Isaiah Thomas as a Music Publisher (1977)
 
 

 Martin, Thomas S. "The Long and the Short of It: A Newspaper Exchange on the Massachusetts Charters, 1772." The William and Mary Quarterly, Third Series, Vol. 43, No. 1 (Jan., 1986), pp. 99-110.
 Shipton, Clifford K. Isaiah Thomas: Printer, Patriot and Philanthropist, 1749-1831 (Rochester: L. Hart, 1948)
 York, Neil L. "Tag-Team Polemics: The" Centinel" and His Allies in the" Massachusetts Spy"." Proceedings of the Massachusetts Historical Society. Vol. 107. 1995.

Primary sources
 Thomas, Isaiah. The Diary of Isaiah Thomas, 1805-1828 (American Antiquarian Society, 1909). online

External links

 "Isaiah Thomas (1749–1831)", University of Delaware Special Collections
 A Brief History of the American Antiquarian Society

1749 births
1831 deaths
Papermakers
18th-century American newspaper publishers (people)
American male journalists
19th-century American newspaper publishers (people)
American printers
American antiquarians
American Antiquarian Society members
Historians of American media

People of Massachusetts in the American Revolution
Businesspeople from Worcester, Massachusetts
Burials at Rural Cemetery (Worcester, Massachusetts)
Businesspeople from Boston
Historians from Massachusetts
Colonial American printers